Mrs Brown (also released in cinemas as Her Majesty, Mrs Brown) is a 1997 British drama film starring Judi Dench, Billy Connolly, Geoffrey Palmer, Antony Sher, and Gerard Butler in his film debut. It was written by Jeremy Brock and directed by John Madden. The film was produced by the BBC and Ecosse Films with the intention of being shown on BBC One and on WGBH's Masterpiece Theatre. However, it was acquired by Miramax and released to unexpected success, going on to earn over $13 million worldwide.

The film was screened in the Un Certain Regard section at the 1997 Cannes Film Festival and released in the United Kingdom on 5 September 1997. Judi Dench won the Golden Globe Award for Best Actress in a Motion Picture - Drama and the BAFTA Award for Best Actress in a Leading Role; additionally, she was nominated for many other awards for her performance, including the Academy Award for Best Actress and the Screen Actors Guild Award for Outstanding Performance by a Female Actor in a Leading Role, but lost both awards to Helen Hunt for her role in As Good as It Gets.

Plot

The film shows the story of a recently widowed Queen Victoria and her relationship with a Scottish servant, John Brown, a trusted servant of her deceased husband, and the subsequent uproar it provoked. Brown had served Victoria's Prince Consort, Prince Albert; Victoria's Household thought Brown might help the Queen who had remained in mourning since the Prince Consort's death in 1861.

In 1863, hoping to subtly coax the Queen toward resuming public life after years of seclusion, Brown is summoned to court. The plan succeeds a little too well for the liking of Victoria's Chief Secretary Sir Henry Ponsonby and The Prince of Wales as well as other members of the Royal Family; the public, press and politicians soon come to resent Brown's perceived influence over Victoria. Brown takes considerable liberties with court protocol, especially by addressing Her Majesty as "woman". He also quickly takes control over the Queen's daily activities, further aggravating the tensions between himself and the Royal Family and servants.

The moniker "Mrs Brown", used both at the time and in the film, implied an improper, and perhaps sexual, relationship. The film does not directly address the contemporary suspicions that Victoria and Brown had had a sexual relationship and perhaps had even secretly married, though cartoons from the satirical magazine Punch are shown as being passed around in Parliament (one cartoon is revealed to the camera, showing an empty throne, with the sceptre lying unhanded across it).

As a result of Victoria's seclusion, especially at Balmoral Castle in Scotland (something initially encouraged by Brown), her popularity begins failing and republican sentiment begins growing. Prime Minister Benjamin Disraeli's hold over the House of Commons is weakening and there is a fear of rising anti-monarchical sentiment in the country. He convinces Brown to use his influence with Victoria to persuade her to return to the performance of her public duties, especially the speech from the throne at the opening of Parliament.

Brown is reluctant to do so, rightly fearing that Victoria will take this as a personal betrayal. When he urges her to return to London and fulfil her public duties, an argument ensues. Feeling betrayed by Brown, Victoria becomes visibly agitated. When Brown once again refers to her as "woman", she sharply rebukes him. Leaving the room, she turns to Ponsonby and Jenner requesting that they serve her needs, visibly demoting Brown's contact and influence. Their relationship was never to be the same again. Victoria's eventual acquiescence and her decision to return to public life leads to a revitalization of her popularity and a resurgence in public support of the monarchy.

Brown continues to serve Victoria until his death in 1883. In his final years, his duties become reduced to head of security. The palace staff has become weary of Brown's dogmatic ways and they mock and rebuke his security efforts as paranoid delusions. Finally, during a public event, a gun-wielding assassin appears out of the crowd leaping toward the Royal Family. An ever-vigilant Brown successfully thwarts the assassination attempt. At dinner the next evening, the Prince of Wales retells the story, bragging to their dinner companions that he had been the one to warn Brown of the assassin. Seeing through her son's bragging, Victoria announces instead that a special medal for bravery, the "Devoted Service Medal," will be minted and awarded to Brown.

Years later, Brown becomes gravely ill with pneumonia after running through the woods late at night chasing a possible intruder. Hearing of his illness, Victoria visits his room and is shaken to see her old friend so ill. She confesses that she has not been as good a friend as she might have been in recent years, and the pneumonia proves fatal for Brown. During his years of service, Brown had kept a diary and, upon his passing, Ponsonby and Jenner discuss its contents stating that it must never be seen by anyone.

The film's closing notes state "John Brown's diary was never found." Jenner also reveals that the Prince of Wales hurled the Queen's favourite bust of Brown over the palace wall, referencing the film's opening sequence.

Cast
 Judi Dench as Queen Victoria
 Billy Connolly as John Brown
 Geoffrey Palmer as Henry Ponsonby
 Antony Sher as Prime Minister Benjamin Disraeli
 Gerard Butler as Archie Brown
 David Westhead as Bertie, Prince of Wales
 Richard Pasco as Dr. Jenner
 Bridget McConnell as Lady Ely
 Georgie Glen as Lady Churchill
 Catherine O'Donnell as Lady in waiting

Reception

Critical reception
On review aggregator website Rotten Tomatoes the film has an approval rating of 92% based on 50 reviews, with an average rating of 7.3/10. The site's critical consensus reads, "Thanks to some top notch acting, the chemistry between its stars, and a witty, thoughtful script, Mrs. Brown delivers a nuanced and entertaining, if not entirely factual, account of a seldom explored historical relationship." Metacritic, another review aggregator, assigned the film a weighted average score of 71 out of 100, based on 22 critics, indicating "generally favorable reviews".

Roger Ebert said, "It is not about sexual love, or even romantic love, really, but about that kind of love based on challenge and fascination." He called Judi Dench "wonderful";  Connolly "has the reserve and self-confidence that most stand-up comics lack almost by definition".

Box office
The film opened 18 July 1997 on 6 screens (including 3 in Los Angeles and 2 in New York) and grossed $76,268 for the weekend. It went on to gross $9.2 million in the United States and Canada. In the UK, the film opened 5 September 1997 on 149 screens and grossed a disappointing £228,469, however, it improved and went on to gross £2,542,212 ($4 million).

Awards and nominations

Soundtrack

Notes

See also
 Victoria & Abdul, an unofficial sequel where Dench also plays Queen Victoria

Films about Queen Victoria
 The Young Victoria
 Victoria & Albert (TV serial)
 Victoria the Great
 Victoria (TV serial)

References

External links
 
 
 
 
 
 
 

1997 films
1990s biographical drama films
British biographical drama films
British historical drama films
BAFTA winners (films)
Films set in the Victorian era
Films set in 1863
Films set in the 1880s
Films scored by Stephen Warbeck
Films directed by John Madden
Films featuring a Best Drama Actress Golden Globe-winning performance
Cultural depictions of Queen Victoria on film
Cultural depictions of Benjamin Disraeli
Films shot in the Scottish Borders
1997 drama films
1990s English-language films
1990s British films